XFS is a computer file system created by Silicon Graphics.

XFS may also refer to:

 X Font Server, a standard mechanism for an X server to communicate with a font renderer
 CEN/XFS, a client-server architecture for financial applications on the Microsoft Windows platform
 Exfoliation syndrome, an eye ailment

See also
 Extent File System (EFS), a file system superseded by XFS
 CXFS (Clustered XFS), a shared disk file system designed by Silicon Graphics